Andrés Gerard Sr. (24 November 1924 – 2012) was a Mexican sailor. He competed in the Star event at the 1964 Summer Olympics.

References

External links
 

1924 births
2012 deaths
Mexican male sailors (sport)
Olympic sailors of Mexico
Sailors at the 1964 Summer Olympics – Star
Sportspeople from Mexico City